Wesley College, informally known as Wesley, is an independent, day and boarding school for boys and girls (co-ed to Year 6 and boys only Years 7–12), situated in South Perth, a suburb of Perth, Western Australia.

The college is a Uniting Church school, which traces its origins back to 1923 when it was established by members of the Methodist Church which was founded by John Wesley.

Since its foundation, the college has been located on a 19 hectare riverside property, near the banks of the Swan River. The campus consists of a Junior School (Manning House) for Pre-kindergarten to Year 4, a Middle School (Years 5 to 8) and a Senior School (Years 9 to 12), performing arts, sporting grounds and boarding facilities for 150 students.

Wesley College is affiliated with the Junior School Heads Association of Australia (JSHAA), the Australian Boarding Schools' Association (ABSA), the Association of Heads of Independent Schools of Australia (AHISA), the Association of Independent Schools of Western Australia (AISWA), and has been a member of the Public Schools Association (PSA) since 1952.

Wesley's sister school is Penrhos College, Perth located in Como.

History 

The foundation stone was laid by the Premier of Western Australia, Sir James Mitchell on 11 November 1922. This stone is still visible at the south-west corner of the original building, now known as the J. F. Ward Wing in honour of the school's first headmaster.

The college began operation in 2 July the following year, with an initial enrolment of 39 boys, and grew steadily in size. This evolution can be traced through the campus architecture which was first extended in 1925 with the construction of a general classroom block, now the RE Kefford Wing. A second storey was added to the original building in 1926, along with various verandahs and a weatherboard library, which have since been demolished.

In 1930, J. F. Ward was succeeded as Headmaster by J. L. Rossiter. A number of new buildings were constructed in the 1930s, including the Headmaster's Residence (now JS Maloney House), a dining hall, extra classrooms and a gymnasium (now the Hamer Wing). The college joined the Public Schools' Association in 1952.

Rossiter was succeeded as Headmaster in 1954 by Norman Roy Collins. During Collins' 11 years' tenure, construction of the Lych Gate, Memorial Chapel (1960–61), the boat shed, the science block (1956, 1959), additional classrooms (1955, 1963) and the swimming pool (1963) were completed.

A new Headmaster, Clive Hamer, was appointed in 1965 and served Wesley until 1983. During this period, Wesley took a lead role in the introduction of the Achievement Certificate in Western Australia (1969–71) and built the boarding houses of Cygnet and Tranby (1968–70), the HR Trenaman Library (1971), classrooms and balconies around the Jenkins Quadrangle (1972), the Collins Oval (1970) and the Joseph Green Centre (1973–78).

In 1977, Wesley came under the auspices of the Uniting Church which resulted from a joining of the Methodist, Presbyterian and Congregational Churches. The first female students were enrolled in 1978 with the opening of a new Junior School on land acquired north of Swan Street.

Roderic Kefford served as the fifth Headmaster from 1984 to 1996 and continued the extensive curriculum changes associated with a broadening of upper secondary programs beyond university entry and the establishment of Wesley's lower secondary structure.  The RE Blanckensee Physical Education Centre was opened in 1987 and the original gymnasium was renovated to become the Hamer Wing classrooms.  The Preparatory School was also extended towards Mill Point Road in 1994.

A site development plan was initiated by John Bednall who was Headmaster from October 1996 to July 2002. This resulted in the refurbishment of the Kefford Wing, the Ward Wing and the Science block, the opening of the Junior School (Manning House) (1999) and Middle School (2000).

In August 2003, David Gee was appointed Wesley's seventh Headmaster. In 2005, the Design, Technology and Visual Arts Centre was opened at a cost of A$4.5 million. In 2006, the Boarding House was refurbished at a cost of $2 million with bigger rooms and a new security link building.

In 2007, construction commenced on the school's biggest project – the A$13 million refurbishment of the Joseph Green Centre. It was officially opened on 9 May 2008 during the school's 85th anniversary year.

David Gee left the school at the completion of the 2018 school year and was replaced in 2019 by Ross Barron, who was previously the Head of Senior School at Hale.

Bednall controversy 
During 2002 it was alleged that John Bednall, the headmaster at the time, had accessed child pornography on the internet.  Bednall resigned immediately and a single charge was laid against him which was discontinued in the WA magistrates Court because of a lack of evidence. Bednall subsequently sued Wesley for wrongful termination. He later accepted a settlement offer from Wesley College Council, which included a statement recognising that Bednall had acted with the best interests of Wesley students in mind.

Campus 

The school is based primarily on its nineteen hectare campus on Coode Street in South Perth which comprises each of the Junior, Middle and Senior Schools.
The school also has playing grounds in Como, Collins Oval. Football, soccer and rugby are the main sports that are played on these grounds.

Building developments 
The first stage of the school's current masterplan saw the $13 million refurbishment of the Joseph Green Centre as a performing arts and function facility, completed in May 2008.  The second stage saw the refurbishment of the Ward and Kefford Wings of the Senior School ($2m) and the Old Boys' Memorial Chapel ($1.5 million). Since 2009 the school has seen the opening of the T.G O'Sullivan Pavilion and a new Languages Centre, as well as a refurbishment of the Hamer Wing and the Mildred Manning Science Centre.

Student life 
The Old Wesley Collegians Association offers a scholarship to a year 11 student, who has a father or grandfather who attended the college, based on sporting, academic and citizenship, both within Wesley and the wider community.  The college offers three scholarships a year to indigenous students from rural and regional areas of Western Australia.

Traditions 
The Wesley war cry is used for victories in sporting and other school events. The traditional Wesley send-off is used to "send off" students involved in major sporting events, and entails the introduction of participants accompanied by students stomping their feet on the wooden floor of the Joseph Green Centre. , this has been informally named the "Woodsey Stomp" in recognition of long serving staff member, Frank Woods, who often received this applause every time he was to take the microphone at assembly. When a well-respected or prominent Wesley teacher retires from the School, a guard of honour is made on the Jenkins Quad.

House system 
Wesley College has eight houses in the senior school, Mofflin, Cygnet, Hardey, Tranby, Grove, Walton, Dickson, Jenkins and six in the junior school, Hardey, Mofflin, Grove, Walton, Dickson, Jenkins. Each house is named in honour of an individual who has had an association with the school, including A. H. Dickinson, one of the founders of the school and Joseph Hardey, one of the first Methodists to settle in Western Australia.  The eight senior school houses compete for the Klem Cup, named in honour of the first student enrolled at the college, while the middle school houses have events every year as they play for the Kay Cup.

Sport 
Wesley has been a member of the Public Schools Association (PSA) since 1952, within which it competes in inter-school sports. Wesley sport is split up into two seasons, a winter and summer season. For summer they have tennis, cricket, water polo, swimming, basketball and rowing. For winter they have soccer, badminton, rugby, Australian rules football and hockey. In 2011 the Wesley College 1st XVIII football team historically won The Alcock Cup breaking a 17-year drought.

PSA premierships 
Wesley has won the following PSA premierships.

 Athletics (3) - 1953, 1955, 1956
 Badminton (14) - 2002, 2004, 2006, 2007, 2009, 2010, 2011, 2012, 2013, 2014, 2015, 2017, 2018, 2021
 Basketball (6) - 1980, 1982, 1985, 1990, 1996, 2017
 Cricket (14) - 1953, 1955, 1957, 1983, 1987, 1988, 1989, 1991, 1993, 1994, 1998, 2003, 2006, 2008
 Football (4) - 1982, 1991, 1994, 2011
 Golf - 2000
 Hockey (13) - 1959, 1960, 1962, 1963, 1964, 1965, 1977, 1978, 1984, 1985, 2009, 2012, 2020
 Rugby (3) - 1987, 1988, 2008
 Soccer (4) - 1990, 1991, 2004, 2005
 Swimming (4) - 1958, 2004, 2005, 2006
 Tennis (6) - 1963, 1967, 1975, 1979, 1980, 1981
 Volleyball (2) - 2010, 2013

Drama 
Wesley has had a strong drama program running for many years. One major production is produced by the Drama department each year. This usually takes place in the second term.

Productions of Oliver, The King and I, Jesus Christ Superstar have been staged, plus the following in more recent years:
2000 - Lord of the Flies (Year 8 Production)
2001 - Oliver!
2002 - Joseph and the Amazing Technicolor Dreamcoat
2005 – Berlin to Broadway
2006 – No major school production was held.
2007 – Charlie and the Chocolate Factory (held at Penrhos College due to Joseph Green Centre Revamp)
2008 – Macbeth (Modern and Musical Version)
2009 – Little Shop of Horrors
2010 – Lockie Leonard: Human Torpedo
2011 – Aladdin
2012 - High School Musical
2013 - The Outsiders
2014 - The Wizard of Oz
2015 - Peter Pan
2016 - Cosí
2017 - The Wedding Singer
2018 - Beauty and the Beast
2019 - Avenue Q - School Edition
2020 - Rent - School Edition
2021 - Blood Brothers
2022 - Little Shop of Horrors (Cancelled due to COVID-19)

Katitjin 
Katitjin is a program partaken by all year 8 students. For the students it is a chance to get out of the classroom and learn within the community. The program is based out of the West Australian Rowing Club on the banks of the Swan River. The program runs for a full term.

The name Katitjin is taken from the Noongar word meaning "to listen and to learn".

Wesley Sports Club 
Wesley's sporting facilities on the South Perth Campus can be used by members of the Wesley Sports Club and the general public. Formed for members of the local South Perth Community, and the college's students, the club operates the Sports Club including swimming classes, weights training, yoga and other programs.

Australian HPV Super Series (Pedal Prix) 
The school has a major involvement in the Australian International HPV Super Series, with the program currently being run by Kyal Rees. The team had been competing in the Busselton round each year since 2014. The 2018 race was their best one ever. The team represented by Finnian Emmett, Tyler Clement, Noah Tarrant, Alexander McAskil and Wallace Cheung had ridden 209 laps (177.65 km) in the 6 hours race and came first in the Senior School Division and also became the WA Champion School. The team had beat Hale School Dell Orean team by 16 laps.

Notable alumni 
The school has produced four Rhodes scholars: R. Rossiter (1935), G. G. Rossiter (1946), M. V. Crockett (1994) and Dustin Stuart (2010).

Sporting
Several alumni of the school have become professional sportsmen. The R.E. Blanckensee Physical Education Centre contains a Hall of Fame showcasing over 160 of Wesley's finest sporting old boys. These include:
 Mark Coughlan, AFL, Richmond Tigers
 Ben Cousins, AFL, West Coast Eagles, Richmond, Brownlow Medallist
 Ian Dick, Hockey, Australia 1948–58, Olympic Captain Melbourne 1956
 Dean Evans, Hockey, Australia 1985–92, Olympic Silver Medal Barcelona 1992
 Mark Ettles, Baseball, Perth Heat, San Diego Padres MLB 1993, Olympics Sydney 2000
 Lance Franklin, AFL, Hawthorn Hawks; Sydney Swans
 Clayton Fredericks, Olympic Equestrian Silver Medal Beijing 2008, 2008 and 2005 World Cup Champion, 2006 British Open Champion
 Michael Gardiner, AFL, West Coast Eagles, St Kilda Football Club
 James Harvey, Basketball, Captain Gold Coast Blaze NBL, Australian captain Boomers 2009 Stankovic Cup, China
 Ben Hollioake, Cricket, England Cricket Team
 Mitchell Marsh, Cricketer, West Australia Cricket Team
 Shaun Marsh, Cricket, Western Warriors, Australia A, Australia
 Arthur Marshall, Tennis, Davis Cup
 Andrew McDougall, AFL, West Coast Eagles, Western Bulldogs
 Scott Meuleman, Cricket, Western Warriors
 David Myers, AFL, Essendon Bombers
 Phil Read, AFL, West Coast Eagles, Melbourne Demons
 Chris Rogers, Cricket, Western Warriors, Australia A, Australia
 John Ryan, Olympic Swimming, Bronze Medal Tokyo 1964
 Jarrad Schofield, AFL, West Coast Eagles, Fremantle Football Club, Port Adelaide
 Bradley Sheppard, Australian rules footballer, West Coast Eagles
 Earl Spalding, AFL, Carlton, Cricket, Western Australia
 Scott Spalding, AFL, Carlton
 Scott Stevens, AFL, Adelaide Crows
 Murray Vernon, Cricket, Western Australia
 Adam Wallace-Harrison, Rugby Union, Super Rugby, ACT Brumbies, Kobelco Steelers
 Blaine Boekhorst, AFL, Carlton Football Club
 Hilton Cartwright, Cricket, Western Australia
 Adam Carter, AFL, West Coast Eagles
 Clem Smith, AFL, Carlton Football Club
 Sam Powell-Pepper, AFL, Port Adelaide Football Club
 Brent Dancer, Hockey, Australia
 Shai Bolton, Richmond Football Club
 Quinton Narkle, Geelong Football Club
 Cameron Zurhaar, North Melbourne Football Club
 Bobby Hill, Greater Western Sydney Giants

Politicians
 Mel Bungey – MHR for Canning (1974–83)
 Geoff Baker - MLA for South Perth (2021-present)
 Kim Chance – WA MLC (1992–present)
 Brendon Grylls – MLA for Merredin (2001–2017)
 Sir Ross Hutchinson, DFC – WA MLA for Cottesloe (1950–77)
 David Johnston – Senator (2001 – 16), Minister for Justice 2007
 Hugh Jones - MLA for Darling Range (2021-present)
 Barry MacKinnon – MLA for Murdoch (1977–93)
 Arthur Marshall, OAM – MLA for Murray (1993–94), Member for Dawesville (1996–2005)
 Ross McLean – MHR for Perth (1975–83)
 Cambell Nalder – MLA for Narrogin (1986–87)
 Sir Crawford Nalder – WA MLA for Wagin (1947–74)
 Dean Nalder - MLA for Alfred Cove (2013–2021)
 Morton Schell -  MLA for Mount Marshall (1986-1989)
 Peter Shack – MHR for Tangney (1977–83, 1984–93)

Academic leaders
Emeritus Professor Geoffrey Bolton, AO, Chancellor Murdoch University 2002–2006
Professor Ralph Slatyer AC, FAA, Chief Scientist of Australia 1989–1992

Arts/media
Peter Cowan AM, author
Joel Creasey, actor and comedian
Alan Fletcher, actor
Stephen Heathcote AM, ballet dancer
Michael Holmes, CNN reporter
Jeremy Sims, actor
Ric Throssell, diplomat, playwright and novelist

See also 

 List of schools in the Perth metropolitan area
 List of boarding schools in Australia

References

Bibliography

External links 
Official Website
Old Wesley Collegians Association

Boarding schools in Western Australia
Boys' schools in Western Australia
Educational institutions established in 1923
Private secondary schools in Perth, Western Australia
Junior School Heads Association of Australia Member Schools in Western Australia
Public Schools Association (Western Australia)
Former Methodist schools in Australia
Uniting Church schools in Australia
 
Private primary schools in Perth, Western Australia
State Register of Heritage Places in the City of South Perth
South Perth, Western Australia
1923 establishments in Australia